Sadar Lingayats (Kannada:ಸಾದರ ಲಿಂಗಾಯತ), sometimes also spelled as Sadhu Lingayats, are a Lingayat community that inhabit Central Karnataka region of the Karnataka state in India. The land-owning feudal community vows its allegiance to Taralabalu Jagadguru Brihanmath, Sirigere. It is one of the dominant sub-castes of the Lingayat community. Gowda, Patel, Patil, Gowdagere and Banakar are some of the prominent surnames used by the community.

History 
The Sadhu Lingayats initially lived in the northern part of modern day Karnataka, where agriculture was their primary livelihood. When a local king attacked the region, which was ruled by his father-in-law, some of these people moved south. Later, others following them south converted to Lingayathism. Haalu Rameshwara, Viswabandhu Marulasiddha, Narappa, Mahdeswara, Karibasajja and Dyamalamba are noted saints of the community, and Harihara and Raghavanka are some noted poets.   

The non-Lingayats are divided into Huvvinavaru (“Those of flowers”) and Hongeyavaru (“Those of the Honge Mara”). The community had a high social status due to their strict vegetarianism and observance of sexual ethics. They adopted the usual Kattemane form of caste organization. They use the caste title Gowda.

Occupation 
Their primary occupations are agriculture and animal husbandry.

Clans 
The population comprises 365 known clans. Some notable clans are Gowdloru, Mattelleru, Monnelleru, Shyavantloru, Adikelleru, Shattelleru, Shakrannaru and Tandasloru.

References

Indian castes